Hollins is a census-designated place (CDP) in Botetourt and Roanoke counties in the U.S. state of Virginia.  Hollins covers much of the area known locally as "North County". The population was 15,574 at the 2020 census. It is part of the Roanoke Metropolitan Statistical Area. The area is also the home of Hollins University in addition to four properties listed on the National Register of Historic Places: the Black Horse Tavern-Bellvue Hotel and Office, Harshbarger House, the Hollins College Quadrangle, and Old Tombstone.

Geography
Hollins is located at  (37.339601, −79.953069).

According to the United States Census Bureau, the CDP has a total area of 8.7 square miles (22.5 km2), all land.

Demographics
As of the census of 2000, there were 14,309 people, 5,722 households, and 3,782 families residing in the CDP. The population density was 1,650.3 people per square mile (637.2/km2). There were 5,947 housing units at an average density of 685.9/sq mi (264.8/km2). The racial makeup of the CDP was 90.68% White, 5.98% African American, 0.18% Native American, 1.86% Asian, 0.01% Pacific Islander, 0.39% from other races, and 0.91% from two or more races. Hispanic or Latino of any race were 1.03% of the population.

There were 5,722 households, out of which 26.2% had children under the age of 18 living with them, 54.0% were married couples living together, 9.2% had a female householder with no husband present, and 33.9% were non-families. 30.7% of all households were made up of individuals, and 15.5% had someone living alone who was 65 years of age or older. The average household size was 2.26 and the average family size was 2.80.

In the CDP, the population was spread out, with 19.1% under the age of 18, 9.2% from 18 to 24, 24.5% from 25 to 44, 24.8% from 45 to 64, and 22.4% who were 65 years of age or older. The median age was 43 years. For every 100 females there were 77.7 males. For every 100 females age 18 and over, there were 70.7 males.

The median income for a household in the CDP was $42,264, and the median income for a family was $50,000. Males had a median income of $36,326 versus $25,599 for females. The per capita income for the CDP was $21,984. About 1.9% of families and 4.9% of the population were below the poverty line, including 3.4% of those under age 18 and 6.8% of those age 65 or over.

Climate
The climate in this area is characterized by hot, humid summers and generally mild to cool winters.  According to the Köppen Climate Classification system, Hollins has a humid subtropical climate, abbreviated "Cfa" on climate maps.

References

Census-designated places in Botetourt County, Virginia
Census-designated places in Virginia
Census-designated places in Roanoke County, Virginia